Debar is a municipality in western part of Republic of North Macedonia. Debar is also the name of the town where the municipal seat is found. Debar Municipality is part of the Southwestern Statistical Region.

Geography
The municipality borders Mavrovo and Rostuša Municipality to the northeast, Kičevo Municipality to the southeast, Centar Župa Municipality to the south, and Albania to the west.

Demographics
According to the last national census from 2021 this municipality has 15,412 inhabitants.

Ethnic groups in the municipality include:
Albanians = 8,438 (54.75%)
Macedonians = 1,155 (7.49%)
Turks = 2,733 (17.73%)
Roma = 1,140 (7.4%)
Others = 432 (2.8%)
Persons of whom data are taken from the administrative sources = 1,499 (9.73%)

Mother tongues in Debar Municipality include:
Albanian: 9,232 (59.9%)
Macedonian: 4,466 (29.0%)
Persons for whom data are taken from administrative sources: 1,499 (9.7%)
Turkish: 189 (1.2%)
Others: 26 (0.1%)

Demographic development of Debar municipality within today borders.

References

External links
Official website

 
Southwestern Statistical Region
Municipalities of North Macedonia